The Val Calanca  is a valley of the Swiss Alps, located in the Lepontine Alps. The valley is drained by the Calancasca, a tributary of the Moesa (Ticino basin), at Roveredo. The highest mountains surrounding  the Val Calanca are the Puntone dei Fraciòn (3,202 metres) and the Zapporthorn (3,152 metres).

The valley belongs to the Moesa District, in the Swiss canton of Graubünden. The main villages are (from north to south): Rossa, Cauco, Selma, Arvigo, Buseno and Santa Maria in Calanca.

References
Swisstopo maps

External links

Val Calanca on MySwitzerland

Valleys of the Alps
Valleys of Graubünden
Lepontine Alps